Ralph Donald Kinney (5 April 1957 – 4 March 2021) was a businessman and political figure in New Brunswick, Canada. He represented York in the Legislative Assembly of New Brunswick from 1999 to 2003.

He was born in Harvey Station, New Brunswick, the son of Don Kinney. He worked with Capital Insurance Services Ltd. and then M.S.C. Insurance, later becoming owner of the second company, renamed McAdam Insurance Services Ltd. He died in 2021 from cancer at the age of 63.

References 

 New Brunswick MLAs, New Brunswick Legislative Library (pdf)

1957 births
2021 deaths
Progressive Conservative Party of New Brunswick MLAs
21st-century Canadian politicians